Rajgadh is a rural municipality in Saptari District in the Sagarmatha Zone of south-eastern Nepal. At the time of the 2017 Nepal census it had a population of 29,459 people living in 8450 individual households.

References 

Rural municipalities in Saptari District
Rural municipalities of Nepal established in 2017
Populated places in Saptari District
Rural municipalities in Madhesh Province